Jared Kuemper is a Canadian born producer, songwriter, engineer, and audio mixer.

He has worked with such artists as Sheryl Crow, Tegan and Sara, Wil, Jann Arden, Jason Falkner, Aaron Pritchett, and Jessie Farrell.

Kuemper has collaborated on several songs that have reached No. 1 or Top 10 status in the Canadian radio charts, including "Fall" by Butterfinger, "Do You Feel" by Butterfinger, and "Take It to the Top" by Jessie Farrell. Other Top 10 songs produced, engineered, or mixed by Jared Kuemper include Aaron Pritchett's "Big Wheel", "Hold My Beer", "Warm Safe Place", and "The Weight", and Jessie Farrell's "Don't Even Try."

Kuemper is based in Toronto.

References

External links
http://www.jaredkuemper.com

Canadian record producers
Canadian songwriters
Canadian audio engineers
Living people
Year of birth missing (living people)
Place of birth missing (living people)